Alai'asa Moefa'auouo Tapuai Sepulona Moananu (born c. 1961) is a Samoan politician. He is a member of the Opposition Human Rights Protection Party and the current member for the Anoama'a No.1 constituency. Moananu is also the Whip for the HRPP.

Personal life 
Sepulona Moananu was born and raised in the village of Falefa to parents Salale Moananu Salale and Eseta Moananu. He is an accountant, a business owner, a farmer, and comes from a family of politicians and leaders. He holds the matai titles of "Tapuai" from Sagone in Savaii, "Moefa'auouo" from the village of Lufilufi and "Alai'asa" from Falefa. His father the late Salale Moananu was elected as MP for Anoama'a in the 1991 election, defeating former Prime Minister Tui Atua Tupua Tamasese Efi before losing the seat in a subsequent case. Alai'asa has 7 siblings (Siaosi, Sinatala, Pola Salale, Makerita Litia, Okesene Lupe, Tapa, and Saulaulu Utulei) and is a father to 7 children (Lapi, Grace, Esther, Timothy Salale, Faith, Christian, and Lydia) and husband to Fugalelea Moananu.

Political Career 
He was first elected to the Legislative Assembly of Samoa in the seat of Salega in the 2006 election under the title of Tapuai. He lost his seat at the 2011 election, but was re-elected as the Member for Anoamaa No. 1 in the 2016 election and appointed Government Whip and Associate Minister of Education, Sports and Culture (MESC). In January 2017 during a debate over a constitutional amendment to declare Samoa a Christian nation, Moananu urged Samoa to back the state of Israel. 

He was re-elected in the 2021 election.

References

Living people
Members of the Legislative Assembly of Samoa
Human Rights Protection Party politicians
People from Atua (district)
Year of birth missing (living people)